Gerry Morielli is a retired Italian-Canadian soccer player who played professionally in the North American Soccer League and Major Indoor Soccer League.

In 1978, Morielli signed with the Houston Hurricane of the North American Soccer League.  He would play three seasons with the Hurricane.  In the fall of 1978, he began his indoor career with the Houston Summit of the Major Indoor Soccer League.  The Summit drew most of its roster from the Hurricane.  After two seasons with the Summit, Morielli moved to the Baltimore Blast for one season before joining the Hartford Hellions. In 1983, he played with FC Inter-Montréal in the Canadian Professional Soccer League.

On January 4, 1979, Morielli played one Olympic qualification game with the Canadian Olympic soccer team in a 3-0 loss to Bermuda. He then played two Pan American Games qualifiers later in the year.

References

External links
NASL/MISL stats
 (archive)

1958 births
Living people
Baltimore Blast (1980–1992) players
Canadian soccer players
Canadian expatriate soccer players
Expatriate soccer players in the United States
Canadian expatriate sportspeople in the United States
Hartford Hellions players
Houston Hurricane players
Houston Summit players
Major Indoor Soccer League (1978–1992) players
North American Soccer League (1968–1984) players
North American Soccer League (1968–1984) indoor players
Montreal Castors players
Association football utility players
Italian emigrants to Canada
Association football defenders
Association football midfielders
Association football forwards
Inter-Montreal players
Canadian Professional Soccer League (original) players